Astrojildo Pereira Duarte Silva (8 November 1890 – 21 November 1965) was a Brazilian politician, writer and journalist. He was a founding member of the Brazilian Communist Party in 1922.

See Also 

 Abílio de Nequete

Notes 

Brazilian politicians
1890 births
1965 deaths
Brazilian communists